The 9mm Japanese revolver, also known as the 9×22mmR Type 26, was a cartridge similar to the .38 S&W. These cartridges are not interchangeable. The rim diameter is thinner and the chamber pressure is lower than most .38 S&W loads. 
The cartridge saw action with the Type 26 revolver in the Russo-Japanese War, World War I, and World War II in a limited role, but the service pistol of the Imperial Japanese Army was the semi automatic Nambu pistol, which fired the 8x22mm Nambu round, which was comparable to .32 ACP.

References
http://members.shaw.ca/nambuworld/originalcollectibleammo.htm

Pistol and rifle cartridges